The Royal Canadian Army Cadets (RCAC) is a national Canadian youth program sponsored by the Canadian Armed Forces and the civilian Army Cadet League of Canada. Under the authority of the National Defence Act, the program is administered by the Canadian Armed Forces and funded through the Department of National Defence. Additionally, the civilian partner of the Royal Canadian Army Cadets, the Army Cadet League of Canada, also ensures financial, accommodations and transportation support for RCAC programs and services at a community level.

Many Royal Canadian Army Cadet corps receive logistical assistance and administrative support from their affiliated Regular Force or Reserve Force unit.

While cadets may wear the badges and accoutrements of their affiliated unit, cadets are not members of the Canadian Armed Forces.

With roots in the early drill associations authorized in 1861, Royal Canadian Army Cadets is Canada's oldest youth program. 

As of 2016, there are approximately 18,920 army cadets in about 429 corps which are spread across the country.

Together with the Royal Canadian Sea Cadets and Royal Canadian Air Cadets, it forms the largest federally funded youth program which is known as the Canadian Cadet Organization.

Members of the Royal Canadian Army Cadets are encouraged to become active and responsible members of their communities.

The Royal Canadian Army Cadets are the rough equivalent to the Junior Reserve Officers' Training Corps in the United States, the Army Cadet Force in the United Kingdom and the Australian Army Cadets in Australia.

Overview
Along with the Royal Canadian Sea Cadets and Royal Canadian Air Cadets, the Royal Canadian Army Cadets are a part of the Canadian Cadet Organizations.

The Royal Canadian Army Cadets and other cadet branches are generally administered by the Reserve Force of the Canadian Armed Forces and are federally funded through the Department of National Defence. Additionally, the program is run in partnership with the civilian Army Cadet League of Canada, which provides supervision of the local corps and squadron sponsors which support the program at the community level. The Army Cadet League of Canada ensures financial, accommodations and transportation support for programs and services not provided by the Department of National Defence.

Cadets are not members of the Canadian Armed Forces, and there is no expectation to join the military at a later date. However, former Cadets who do decide to go on to join the military may find that there are certain benefits to be found within the military in certain areas such as basic training (BMQ, BMQ-L and occupation specific training). The service records for members of the Royal Canadian Army Cadets, which are usually digitally created but sometimes physically made, are not destroyed until the age of twenty five. These service records may be very helpful as a reference for future military service.

In keeping with Commonwealth custom, the Royal Canadian Army Cadets stand second in the order of precedence, after the Royal Canadian Sea Cadets and before the Royal Canadian Air Cadets.

Youths of any country of origin, nationality and citizenship can join the Royal Canadian Army Cadets, provided that they are 12 to 18 years of age. There is no enrolment fee to join a Royal Canadian Army Cadet Corps. Some local sponsors request a voluntary registration fee to assist with expenses not covered by the Canadian Forces such as hall rental.  Uniforms, training manuals, and instruction are provided. If a cadet remains in a corps until the day prior to their 19th birthday, then they may be "aged out" following a special ceremony which happens during their final parade night. For example a Cadet Regimental Sergeant Major who is departing a corps will relinquish the senior position by passing on the drill cane or the corps flag to his or her successor.  Upon departing the Royal Canadian Army Cadets, most of the items (specifically personal kit) issued to them during their time in the program must be returned.

The organization and rank system of the Canadian Army is used. Cadets are appointed to non-commissioned member ranks and take seniority amongst themselves. A few large school-sponsored cadet corps use Canadian Army commissioned officer designations from Lieutenant to Lieutenant Colonel, a practice that is not officially recognized.

Adult leadership is provided by members of the Canadian Forces Reserve sub-component which is known as the Cadet Organization Administration and Training Service, which is composed mostly of officers of the Cadet Instructor Cadre (CIC) branch. The leadership of each individual corps is supplemented, if necessary, by contracted Civilian Instructors (CIs), authorized adult volunteers, and, on occasion, officers and non-commissioned members of other Canadian Armed Forces branches. The CIC branch is specifically trained to administer and support the Royal Canadian Sea, Army, and Air Cadet training program. Like all other Reserve Force members, they come from all walks of life and all parts of local communities. Some commissioned CIC officers are former cadets themselves, while others may have former Regular Force or Reserve Force service.

Aim
The aim of the Royal Canadian Army Cadets is "to develop in youth the attributes of good citizenship and leadership; promote physical fitness; and stimulate the interest of youth in the sea, land, and air activities of the Canadian Forces." The Royal Canadian Army Cadets shares this aim with the Sea and Air Cadets; however, each focuses on its own element.

RCAC Badge 
The badge of the Royal Canadian Army Cadets is the official emblem of the Royal Canadian Army Cadets. It is worn on the upper sleeve of the cadet uniform and on the breast of the issue parkas. It is also worn as a brass or cloth cap badge in place of an affiliated unit badge or for non-affiliated corps. The motto of Acer Acerpori is Latin for "as the maple, so the sapling".

History

Early history 

The Royal Canadian Army Cadets (RCAC) can trace its history to the creation of drill associations or militia companies in 1861, predating confederation by six years. These early militia companies and drill associations were not cadet corps but were militia sub-units formed in educational and other public institutions.  Enrolment was limited to men between the ages of 13 and 60. The drill was not only a parade square and discipline exercise, but a skill that was necessary for the defence of the Colony. The American Civil War and the threat of the Fenian Raids motivated their creation in Upper and Lower Canada.

In 1866, when the Fenians threatened Ontario, the Upper Canada College Rifle Company was called to active service, along with its parent regiment. While the regiment marched to Ridgeway to confront the Fenian invaders, the UCC Rifle Company guarded the port, armouries and government buildings of Toronto. For this deed, the student company proudly carried the battle honour “FENIAN RAID 1865-66” on its drums and colours from that day forward. Students in the battalion who stood guard also were entitled to receive the Canadian General Service Medal, with their names inscribed on the medal’s edge and the “Fenian Raid 1866” bar on its red and white striped ribbon.

Trinity College Volunteer Rifle Company was formed on June 1, 1861 in Port Hope, Ontario. Bishop’s College Drill Association was formed in Lennoxville, Quebec, on December 6, 1861. Another 14 of the early "Drill Associations" or "Rifle Companies" stood up in Ontario and Quebec. Canada's oldest continuously-active cadet corps is No. 2 Bishop's College School Cadet Corps in Lennoxville, Quebec (Nov. 1879), and No. 7 Royal Canadian Army Cadets in St. Thomas, Ontario (Feb. 1880), both having roots firmly in the previous drill associations.

In 1904, the allocation of numbers to cadet corps was instituted and the Quarterly Militia List, correct to April 1, 1904, lists Cadet Organizations from 1 to 104. The earliest date of organization shown is November 28, 1879, four months after Militia General Order 18 of July 25, 1879 allowed the formations of 74 "Associations for Drill in Educational Institutions" for young men. These cadets were taught drill and marksmanship, but were not required to be employed in active service. The 74 associations included 34 in Ontario, 24 in Québec, 13 in the Maritimes, two in Manitoba, and one in British Columbia.

The origin of the term "cadet corps" is debatable, as some believe it was first used in 1898, in Ontario, bundled in a provision that the corps' instructors would be members of the local school teaching staff, and not from the local militia unit.

Public support 

Increased support, motivated in part by the Northwest Campaign during the Riel Rebellion of 1885, allowed improved issue of uniforms, weapons and other equipment to schools providing military training.

Cadet Instructor Cadre 
The first authority for cadet instructors to hold rank in the Militia was established by Special General Order Dec. 21, 1903.  The appointment was 2nd Lieutenant and the officer was permitted to retain the rank only as long as he remained an instructor and the cadet corps remained efficient.

On May 1, 1909 a cadre of commissioned officers, as a Corps of School Cadet Instructors was established. It was composed of qualified male school teachers.  On May 1, 1921 the Corps was reorganized on Jan 1, 1924 and designated the Cadet Services of Canada. It was a component of the Canadian Army Non-Permanent Active Militia and the forerunner of the current Cadet Instructor Cadre.

With the integration of the Canadian Armed Forces in 1968, the officer cadre was designated as the Cadet Instructors List, a sub-component of the Reserve Force of the Canadian Armed Forces.

In July 1994, it was re-named to the Cadet Instructor Cadre.

In 2009, the Reserve Force sub-component was re-named to the Cadet Organization Administration and Training Service and includes the CIC Branch and former members of the Primary Reserve and Regular Force who retain their previous branch affiliation while serving the Cadet Organization.

Strathcona Trust 
In 1910, Sir Donald Alexander Smith, Lord Strathcona, the Canadian High Commissioner to Britain, created a trust with the Dominion Government with a sum of $500,000, with the aim of inspiring citizenship and patriotism. through physical training, rifle shooting, and military drill. He is remembered today with the Lord Strathcona Medal, which is awarded to a cadet in each corps and squadron who best exemplifies the qualities of being a cadet.

World Wars 

Approximately 40,000 former cadets served in His Majesty's forces during the First World War. By the end of the war, there were approximately 64,000 boys enrolled in army cadet corps across Canada.

During the twenty years following the First World War, cadet training came to a standstill. Many corps survived these hard times, but the Great Depression and the lack of public interest caused the cancellation of the uniform grant for army cadets in 1931. The instructional grant for 12 and 13 year olds was additionally cancelled in 1934. In Alberta, only a couple of corps functioned beyond 1934.

The beginning of the Second World War brought a renewed public interest in cadet training. Many cadet corps were raised in high schools across the country.

Post-war years 

In 1942, in recognition of the significant contribution of former cadets to the ongoing war effort, His Majesty King George VI granted the "Royal" prefix to the Canadian Army Cadets, giving it the title of the Royal Canadian Army Cadets. The Royal prefix was also afforded Sea at the same time. Air cadets were given the Royal prefix in 1953 by Her Majesty Queen Elizabeth II.

It is estimated that nearly 230,000 former army cadets served in His Majesty's forces during the Second World War.

After 1945, quotas were imposed, which ended up reducing Canada's total cadet membership to approximately 75,000 members. Many of the closed corps, those with membership restricted to boys in one particular school, were disbanded; some of them became open corps, training in Militia armouries or in Legion halls; others acquired their own buildings.

The Korean War stimulated growth among open corps in the early 1950s. Many school corps moved to armouries and drill halls. Regular Force members, many who had served in Korea staffed the Area Cadet Offices that managed the corps and the summer camps.

Unification of the Canadian Forces 

Following the unification of the Canadian Forces in 1968, a number of changes occurred in the Army Cadet world:

 QR&O (Cadets) brought Sea and Air Cadet commissioned officers under the single service control of the Canadian Forces and standardized the three Cadet Organizations.
 A directorate of cadets was established in Ottawa, at the Department of National Defence headquarters, to set policy and co-ordinate the activities of the Sea, Army and Air Cadet Organizations.
 The Army Cadet League of Canada was formed in 1971 to provide the Royal Canadian Army Cadets with the same civilian and Canadian Armed Forces partnership structure that was enjoyed by Sea Cadets and Air Cadets through the long established Navy League and the Air Cadet League.
 Officers of the Cadet Services of Canada, The Royal Canadian Sea Cadets and former Royal Canadian Air Force Reserve Cadet Instructors were consolidated in the Cadet Instructor List, which was redesignated the Cadet Instructor Cadre in July 1994.
The Army Cadet League's Arms, Supporters, Flag and Badge were registered with the Canadian Heraldic Authority on March 31. 1995

Females in the cadet program 

Females were unofficial participants in cadet training almost from the very beginning of cadets.
 
Shortly after the Highland Cadet Corps was formed at the Guelph Grammar School at Guelph in 1882, an all-female cadet company called the Daughters of the Regiment were started. The Canadian Army provided no support for training or uniforms for the all-female cadet company. In addition, females were prohibited from attending summer training at camps.
 
On July 30, 1975, the Parliament of Canada amended the relevant legislation by changing the word "boys" to "persons", therefore permitting females to become members of the Royal Canadian Army Cadets. Therefore, females became full participants in the cadet branch. The biggest change was during the summer training program: what had been for many decades an exclusively male environment changed dramatically at local corps and at Army Cadet Summer Training Centres. Today, males and females are given equality of opportunity as it relates to participating in any and all Royal Canadian Army Cadet corps-level functions.

2004 – 125th anniversary 

2004 marked the 125th anniversary of the Royal Canadian Army Cadets. The Army Cadet League of Canada issued a 125th Anniversary pin to be worn by all 25,000+ army cadets across the country at the time. Canada Post honoured the cadets with a stamp which was unveiled in Ottawa in March 2004. Many parades honouring the century-and-a-quarter of cadets occurred across Canada: there were Freedom of the City parades in Vernon, Oromocto and Calgary as well as other major cities and towns across the country. The original Royal Banner was laid up in Vernon during the final battalion parade on August 19 at the Army Cadet Summer Training Centre, and the new Royal Banner was paraded in front of 1,500 cadets and 2,000 members of the audience.

RCAC Training

Optional Training 
In the cadet program there are several optional training programs which consist of:

Military Band and Pipes Band
Marksmanship
Biathlon
First Aid Program
Drill Team
Orienteering
Rappelling
Parachuting

This optional training is an extension of the mandatory training that cadets receive within their individual corps.

Star Level Program 

The Star Level Program is the main training program carried out by all Royal Canadian Army Cadet corps within Canada. This program is mandated by the Department of National Defence and specifically through the Directorate of Cadets & Junior Rangers.

The Star Level Program is composed of five levels:

Green Star (Level 1)
Red Star (Level 2)
Silver Star (Level 3)
Gold Star (Level 4)
Master Cadet (Level 5)

Starting in the 2012-13 training year, the National Star of Excellence or NSE replaced the National Star Certification Examination or NSCE as a ranking tool for Senior Cadets. Year 5 of LHQ training was also introduced as "Master Cadet" consisting of a great deal of On the Job Training (OJT) and self-led professional development opportunities.

Cadets are taught a variety of subjects, known as Performance Objectives (PO) that include: citizenship, physical fitness, healthy living, drill, marksmanship, map and compass, outdoor survival, eco-friendly camping and military history and traditions. To better assist in understanding the Star Level training, the Star programs are identified as follows:

Green Star 

PO 101—Participate in Citizenship Activities:  Cadets are introduced to Canadian history, traditions and symbols.  Cadets are also introduced to Canada’s political system, along with a high-education of the Canadian Forces.
PO 102 – Perform Community Service:  Cadets are introduced to the concept of volunteerism and importance of community involvement.
PO 103 – Participate as a Member of a Team:  Cadets are introduced to the concept of teamwork and are introduced to the roles of a follower.
PO 104 – Track Participation in Physical Activities:  Cadets are introduced to the importance of physical activity, physical fitness and physical health.
PO 105 – Participate in Recreational Sports:  Cadets participate in a variety of recreational sports, such as running, biking, hiking, marches and swimming activities.
PO 106 – Fire the Cadet Air Rifle: Cadets are introduced to the operation and safe handling of the Daisy 853C air rifle as well as some basic marksmanship techniques.
PO 107 – Serve in an Army Cadet Corps:  Cadets are introduced to the history and traditions of the Cadet Corps.  Cadets are introduced to Green Star and Year 1 training opportunities.  Cadets are taught the basic rules with regards to being a cadet.
PO 108 – Perform Drill Movements During an Annual Ceremonial Review (ACR) Parade:  Cadets are introduced and taught ceremonial drill, in preparation for public parades.
PO 111 – Participate in Recreational Summer Biathlon: Cadets are introduced to the basics of summer biathlon.
PO 120 – Participate in Canadian Armed Forces Familiarization Activities: Cadets participate in activities involving CAF members or tradition such as a mess dinner or by having a CAF guest speaker.
PO 121 – Participate as a Member of a Team During an Overnight Bivouac Field Training Exercise (FTX): Cadets are introduced to basic skills for camping such as equipment selection, pitching tents, knot tying, and environmental hazards and injuries.
PO 122 – Identify Location Using a Map: Cadets are introduced to different types and styles of maps, basic map skills, and how to take a Grid reference.
PO 123 – Participating in a Day Hike: Cadets are taught how to select appropriate clothing and equipment for a day hike as well as participating in one.

Red Star 

PO 201 – Participate in Citizenship Activities:
PO 202 – Perform Community Services:
PO 203 – Demonstrate Leadership Attributes Within a Peer Setting:
PO 204 – Track Physical Activity:
PO 205 – Participate in Recreational Sports:
PO 206 – Fire the Cadet Air Cadet Rifle During Recreational Marksmanship:
PO 207 – Serve in an Army Cadet Corps:
PO 208 – Execute Drill as a Member of a Squad:
PO 211 – Participate in Competitive Summer Biathlon Activities:
PO 220 – Participate in Canadian Armed Forces Familiarization:
PO 221 – Perform the Duties of a Section Member During a Weekend Bivouac Exercise:
PO 222 – Navigate Along a Route Using a Map and Compass:
PO 223 – Hike along a Route as Part of an Overnight Exercise:
PO 224 – Identify Immediate Actions to Take when Lost:

Silver Star 

PO 301 – Participate in Citizenship Activities:
PO 302 – Perform Community Service:
PO 303 – Perform the Role of a Team Leader:
PO 304 – Track Physical Activity:
PO 305 – Participate in Recreational Sports:
PO 306 – Fire the Cadet Air Rifle During Recreational Marksmanship:
PO 307 – Serve in an Army Cadet Corps:
PO 308 – Direct a Squad Prior to A Parade:
PO 309 – Instruct a Lesson:
PO 311 – Participate in a Recreational Summer Biathlon Activity:
PO 320 – Participate in Canadian Armed Forces Familiarization
PO 321 – Perform the Duties of a Team Leader On A Weekend Bivouac Exercise:
PO 322 – Plot Location on a Topographical Map Using A Global Positioning System Receiver:
PO 324 – Survive When Lost:
PO 325 – Identify the Competencies of an Outdoor Leader:
PO 326 – Perform Expedition Skills:

Gold Star 

PO 401 - Participate in Citizenship Activities:
PO 402 - Perform Community Service:
PO 403 - Act as a Team Leader:
PO 404 - Track Physical Activity:
PO 405 - Participate in Recreational Sports:
PO 406 - Fire the Cadet Air Rifle During Recreational Marksmanship:
PO 407 - Serve in an Army Cadet Corps:
PO 408 - Command a Platoon on Parade:
PO 409 - Instruct a Lesson:
PO 420 - Participate in Canadian Armed Forces Familiarization
PO 422 - Follow a Multi-Leg Route Using a Global Positioning System (GPS) Receiver:
PO 424 - Employ Natural Resources in a Survival:
PO 425 - Develop an Expedition Plan:
PO 426 - Perform Expedition Skills:

Master Cadet 
The Master Cadet is the highest star level. It is earned only by those who have attained all the star levels. Cadets are required to complete their "Master Cadet Handbook" and attend a Master Cadet Workshop at the zone level to achieve the Master Cadet certification. Cadets that are working on their Master Cadet certification are only Gold Star qualified.

Summer Training 
Selected Army Cadets attend summer training at locations across Canada. The training supports and expands the local headquarters program. Courses last from two to eleven weeks, with most cadets attending the two-week "General Training" (Commonly referred to as "GT", as Basic is now a new section of three-week courses) course in their first year.

Experienced cadets may apply to be employed as staff cadets to assist the adult instructors.

Summer Training Courses 
Summer Training Courses are as follows:
General Training (2 Weeks).
Basic Expedition (3 weeks).
Basic Drill & Ceremonial (3 weeks).
Basic Fitness & Sports (3 Weeks).
Basic Marksman (3 Weeks).
Basic Military Band (3 Weeks).
Basic Pipes and Drums (P&D) (3 Weeks).
Fullbore Marksman Phase I (6 Weeks) (Connaught CTC Only).
Intermediate Military Band (6 Weeks).
Intermediate Pipes and Drums (P&D) (6 Weeks).
Expedition Instructor (EI) (6 Weeks).
Drill and Ceremonial Instructor (DCI) (6 Weeks).
Fullbore Marksman Phase II (7 Weeks) (Connaught
CTC Only).
Fitness and Sports Instructor (FSI) (6 Weeks).
Air Rifle Marksmanship Instructor (ARMI) (6 Weeks).

Cadets completing an Instructor-level course may apply for advanced training to be appointed as a staff cadet at a cadet training centre (CTC) or engage in the advanced training course or exchange, such as:
Advanced Military Band (6 Weeks).
Advanced Pipes and Drums (P&D) (6 Weeks).
Leadership & Challenge (L&C) (Rocky Mountain Cadet Training Centre Only) (6 Weeks)
Canadian Forces Basic Parachutist Course. (Para) (4 Weeks)****
Maple Leaf Exchange*. (Scotland, England, Wales**, Belgium, France) (6 Weeks)***
National Rifle Team 9 Weeks (Bisley).
Voyage In History (3 Weeks)

*Outward Bound courses has been merged with Maple Leaf Exchange.

**Limited number of cadets attend the Wales CCAT (Cadet Center for Adventurous Training), under discretion of the Officer In Charge (OIC) of the exchange.

***One week of the exchange is spent in CTC Connaught, Ontario.

****The Canadian Forces Basic Parachutist Course was not listed as an option for Army Cadets in the 2022 summer training rescope.

Cadet Training Centres 
During the summertime, some members of the Royal Canadian Army Cadets are selected for summer training. They go on to train at various camps which include:

Blackdown Cadet Training Centre which is located at CFB Borden.
Argonaut Cadet Training Centre which is located at CFB Gagetown.
Cold Lake Cadet Training Centre which is located at CFB Cold Lake.
Connaught Training Centre which is located in Nepean, Ontario.
Mont St-Sacrement Cadet Music Training Centre which is located in Quebec City.
Rocky Mountain National Army Cadet Summer Training Centre which is located in Municipal District of Bighorn No. 8.
Valcartier Cadet Training Centre which is located at CFB Valcartier.
Vernon Cadet Training Centre which located in Vernon, British Columbia.
Whitehorse Cadet Training Centre which is located in Whitehorse, Yukon.

Additional Training Centres

 Canadian Army Advanced Warfare Centre (Trenton, Ontario) for Canadian Forces Basic Parachutist's Course only.

Uniform

Headdress 
A variety of headdresses are worn by the Royal Canadian Army Cadets, such include:

 The beret is the most common form of headdress. The colour black is worn by armored and artillery, rifle green by infantry, scarlet by Military Police, and maroon by Airborne Cadet Corps).
 The glengarry, balmoral, and caubeen are typically worn by kilted regiments and their respective pipe bands. These regiments typically wear green berets in place of their other headdresses when in their Field Training Uniform.
 These pieces of headdress are typically considered regimental kit, and are typically not issued to junior ranks.
 The Forage Cap is also a form of headdress typically worn by G.G.H.G. (Governor General's Horse Guards) and G.G.F.G. (Governor General's Foot Guards) affiliated Cadet Corps.

All forms of headdress are accompanied with a cap-badge or cap-brass representing the Cadet Corps' affiliated regiment or a simple cap-badge with the standard Royal Canadian Army Cadet badge. It is colloquially known by Cadets as the "cookie-cutter" badge. For example, Cadet Corps that are affiliated with the Royal Canadian Dragoons wear a cap-brass with a springbok.

Full Dress Uniform 

 All Cadets are issued with a standard, rifle green tunic, which, apart from the material and colour, mimics the style of Canadian Expeditionary Force tunics during the First World War.
 The tunic is accompanied by a waist belt secured by loops sewn onto the tunic itself.
 Although unofficial in the Cadet Administrative Training Orders (CATO), upon a promotion to a certain rank, appointment, membership to the drill team, flag party or other circumstances the Cadet may be issued a white or black parade belt with either the regiment's brass buckle, or the standard Canadian Forces brass buckle.
 The top button of the tunic is always left undone and a tie is worn with an issued short sleeve collared shirt.
 Special cases such as rank, appointment, regimental standing orders, or weather may call for the wear of the tunic without a tie, or with an ascot (Under discretion of the Commanding Officer of Unit or CSTC).
 All badges showing a Cadet's corps, achievement, and rank are sewn directly onto the tunic.
 Cadet Medals are worn on the right side (In accordance with national direction that only Orders, Decorations, or Medals that are part of the Canadian Honours System are worn on the left).

Parade Boots 

 In 2017, Cadets Canada released a Multipurpose Boot, designed to eventually replace both Parade Boots and Combat Boots. However, most corps still use the Canadian Forces Parade Boots. (as of 2019)
Cadets are issued with one pair of Canadian Forces parade boots, or the Multipurpose Boots. These boots come in three main variations. They are typically referred to as:
 Parade boots (1st Gen):
 Similar in appearance to British ammunition boots
 American Biltrite oil and acid resistant sole
 Steel toe
 Typically manufactured by Boulet
 No longer in production, issued by some Cadet Corps
 Regarded as being louder, easier to polish, and longer lasting by Cadets
 Hybrid boots (2nd Gen):
 Steel toe
 Similar in appearance to parade boots
 Current issue by both the Canadian Forces and Army, Air and Sea Cadets
 "Moon" boots (3rd Gen):
 Feature a clunky and heavy Vibram sole
 Drastically different in appearance to parade boots and hybrid boots
 Current issue by both the Canadian Forces and Army, Air and Sea Cadets

Cadet Field Training Uniform (FTU) or OG-107 Combat Uniform 

 Cadets are issued a pair of pants and a tunic that is olive drab in colour and is the exact cut of Canadian Forces uniforms of 2000-2010.
Cadets are authorized to wear the Cadet Field Training Uniform, depending on the supply of the unit or CSTC, according to their duties and/or at the discretion of their Commanding Officer.
The Cadet Field Training Uniform has rank slides on the centre of the chest, while the OG-107 Combat Uniforms have rank slides on the shoulders.
The Cadet Field Training Uniforms can be easily identified by the "Cadets Canada" logo embroidered on the large pocket covers on the shirt and the pants.  
 Some Cadet Corps (depending on budget and other expenditures) provide combat boots free of charge to their Cadets. Others may purchase their own pair of boots from Army Surplus stores, private trades, or have them handed down from retired Cadets.
 Due to shortages in black CF Mark Three and Four boots, Cadets have been requested to purchase much more expensive proprietary boots (Ex. S.W.A.T.), or used tan CF boots.
However, cadets are not to be required to purchase their own combat boots. They must be issued to be considered a mandatory requirement.
With the introduction of Multipurpose Boots in 2017, cadets are able to wear the same boots from their parade uniform on their C-5 dress (if they are Multipurpose Boots).
 The tunic has two drawstrings; one at the hem and one at the waist to give the tunic a form fitting appearance.
 The trousers are to be bloused above the boot with blousing bands, or with the included drawstrings at the bottom of each pant leg.

Rank structure 

Note: Cadet insignia are distinguished from their Canadian Armed Forces counterparts through the inclusion of "CADET" written at the bottom of the slip-on (not shown below).

*Individual corps may have their own local requirements for promotions, in addition to the national standards (shown above).

The second rank of "Lance Corporal", formerly "Private", was changed in January 2010, due to the French translation "Soldat" being the word "Soldier".

If an Army Cadet Corps has an affiliation with a unit of the Canadian Army that traditionally has different titles for the Ranks of "Private", "Corporal", and "Master Corporal", then they are then entitled to make use of those alternative titles for the ranks of "Lance Corporal", "Corporal, and "Master Corporal" in their units as well.

In the guard regiments, warrant officers are known as "colour sergeants" and second lieutenants are known as "ensigns", although the latter does not exist in the RCAC program.

Honours and awards 
The Canadian Cadet Movement maintains its own Honours and Awards system. Cadets may be awarded these based on criteria including bravery, citizenship, service, outstanding performance on a summer training course, and more. In addition, cadets may also wear, on their uniform, any orders, decorations, and medals of Canada they have been awarded.

Within the system, there are several honours and awards common to all three cadet elements and some that are unique to each. A cadet who transfers from one element to another may continue to wear any medals awarded from their previous service, but in general, army cadets may be eligible for the following eight honours and awards, and are in the order of precedence:

See also
 Army Cadet Force
 Australian Army Cadets
 2537 Battlefords Army Cadets

References

External links 

Canadian Cadet Organizations website
RCAC Unit Directory
Army Cadet League of Canada
Royal Canadian Army Cadets History – Army Cadet League of Canada

Military of Canada
Army cadet organisations
Canadian Cadet organizations
Youth organizations based in Canada